Pelli Sambandham is a 2000 Indian Telugu-language comedy-drama film, produced by C. Aswini Dutt and K. Raghavendra Rao and directed by K. Raghavendra Rao. It stars Akkineni Nageswara Rao, Sumanth, Sakshi Shivanand, Sanghavi, with music composed by S. A. Rajkumar. The film is a remake of the Tamil language film Pooparika Varugirom (1999).

Cast
Akkineni Nageswara Rao as Sitaramayya / Kaasi
Sumanth
Sakshi Shivanand 
Sanghavi
Raghuvaran
Kota Srinivasa Rao
Brahmanandam 
Tanikella Bharani
M. S. Narayana
A.V.S
Brahmaji
Raja Ravindra
Prasad Babu
Raghunatha Reddy 
Sudha
Priya
Varsha
Delhi Rajeshwari
Kalpana Rai

Soundtrack

References

External links
 

2000 films
2000s Telugu-language films
Films directed by K. Raghavendra Rao
Telugu remakes of Tamil films